A destructive and deadly tornado outbreak impacted the Red River Valley on April 10, 1979. Several strong to violent tornadoes touched down throughout the region that day. One F4 tornado impacted Vernon, Texas. The most notable tornado was another F4 tornado that destroyed most of the southern part of Wichita Falls, Texas, and is commonly referred to as "Terrible Tuesday" by many meteorologists. Additional tornadoes were reported across the Southern Plains as well as in the Mississippi River Valley on April 11–12. Overall, the outbreak killed 58 people and injured 1,927 others.

Meteorological Synopsis 
A deepening low pressure system formed in Colorado as a warm front lifted north pulling warm, moist, unstable air. There was strong upper level dynamics all coming together to produce strong tornado-producing supercells. In the early afternoon hours, three supercell thunderstorms formed. They moved northeastward, and as a trio spawned families of tornadoes. These supercells caused the most damaging tornadoes of the outbreak.

The first tornado formed near Crowell, Texas, at around 3:05 p.m. About 35 minutes later, the first killer one of the outbreak ripped through Vernon and killed 11 people. Then the supercell spawned one that killed three people in Lawton, Oklahoma. The second supercell spawned one that moved .

The third supercell was the one that formed the Seymour and Wichita Falls tornadoes as part of a three-member tornado family. The first tornado formed near Seymour at around 4:53 pm. The storm spawned a second tornado that moved through the south and east sides of Wichita Falls at around 6:00 pm. The third member of the family formed near Waurika, Oklahoma, at around 8:00 p.m.

Confirmed tornadoes

April 10 event

April 11 event

April 12 event

Wichita Falls, Texas

The Wichita Falls tornado formed in Archer County and moved northeast and damaged a few rural homes and high voltage towers at F1-F2 intensity. It rapidly intensified to F4 intensity as it entered the city near Memorial Stadium by McNiel Jr. High School on Southwest Parkway, which was located to the west of Wichita Falls at approximately 6:07 p.m., damaging both structures severely. Hail the size of golf balls preceded the touchdown and continued for approximately 15 minutes. It then became calm before the winds began to pick up.

It first destroyed an apartment complex, where the first fatalities took place, as it moved along Southwest Parkway. Continuing east-northeastward, the violent tornado destroyed a large portion of a residential neighborhood before heavily damaging a commercial building along Southwest Parkway. The Southwest National Bank Building was completely obliterated, leaving nothing behind except for its vault. As it moved north of Southwest Parkway, the tornado destroyed many homes in both the Western Hills Addition and the Faith Village Addition and severely damaged Ben Milam Elementary School. The tornado then crossed over Kemp Boulevard and destroyed several commercial businesses, including a restaurant, resulting in several additional fatalities. Despite passing north of the Sikes Senter Shopping Mall, intense winds from the outer circulation of the tornado heavily damaged a few stores and blew many cars in the mall's parking lot some distance away from where they originated and stacked on top of each other. Still at F4 intensity as it moved east-northeastward, the tornado moved over a greenbelt area, passing just barely south of Midwestern State University as it severely damaged several more housing additions. (Colonial Park, Hursh, Southmoor, Southwinds, and Southern Hills) A number of people tried to flee as the tornado moved along US 281 and 287 by driving east on Southwest Parkway. The tornado blew many of those vehicles off those roadways, inflicting numerous fatalities. 25 of the 42 fatalities from the tornado were vehicle related, 16 of which were of people who left their homes to evade the massive tornado. Only 5 of the homes that were left actually incurred damage.

The tornado then weakened slightly, but remained at F3 intensity, destroying the Sun Valley housing area, the Sunnyside Heights Mobile Home Park, and several large commercial businesses, including the Levi Strauss Plant, before exiting the east side of town. It then moved into Clay County and changed its appearance to display a multiple-vortex structure. There were at times five separate vortices visible within the tornado. It inflicted additional F0-F2 damage south of Dean and Byers, but no more fatalities occurred. Crossing into Oklahoma, the tornado inflicted additional damage near Waurika before dissipating.

The injury count for this tornado was 1,740, the most injuries ever recorded for an F4/EF4 tornado. It is believed that many more minor injuries were never recorded.

Aftermath 

At the end of the outbreak, 54 people lost their lives in Texas, three were killed in Oklahoma and one was killed in Indiana. The Wichita Falls tornado alone killed 42 people and caused $400 million in damage ($ in today's dollars). The tornado cut a path  through the city, with significant devastation.

See also 
 List of North American tornadoes and tornado outbreaks

Notes

References 

 Fujita, T.T., and Wakimoto, R.M. (1979). "Red River Valley tornado outbreak of April 10, 1979", University of Chicago.

External links and sources 
 The April 10, 1979 Severe Weather Outbreak by Don Burgess
 The Red River Valley Tornado Outbreak of April 10, 1979 (NWS Norman, Oklahoma)
 Full map of the 1979 Red River Valley tornado outbreak Tornado History Project
 A survivor's story (Joel Manes)
 47miles.org - A project to construct a memorial to the Wichita Falls tornado
 Terrible Tuesday - Wichita Falls, Texas Tornado 1979
 Terrible Tuesday (1979) Red River Valley Tornado Outbreak
 Terrible Tuesday: April 10, 1979 in Wichita Falls, Texas
 Coming Back: Wichita Falls, TX Tornado - April 10, 1979 KAUZ-TV
 

F4 tornadoes by date
Red River Valley,1979-04-10
Tornadoes in the United States
R
Tornadoes in Texas
Tornadoes in Oklahoma
Tornadoes in Kansas
Tornadoes in Arkansas
Tornadoes in Louisiana
Tornadoes in Nebraska
Tornadoes in Mississippi
Tornadoes in Kentucky
Tornadoes in Indiana
Tornadoes in Tennessee
Tornadoes in Alabama
R
Red River Valley
April 1979 events in the United States